Pürevdorjiin Orkhon (born December 25, 1993) is a Mongolian freestyle wrestler. She competed in the women's freestyle 58 kg event at the 2016 Summer Olympics, in which she was eliminated in the repechage by Sakshi Malik. In 2017, she won a gold medal at Paris World Wrestling Championships in 63 kg.

References

External links
 

1993 births
Living people
Mongolian female sport wrestlers
World Wrestling Championships medalists
Olympic wrestlers of Mongolia
Wrestlers at the 2016 Summer Olympics
Wrestlers at the 2018 Asian Games
Asian Games competitors for Mongolia
Asian Wrestling Championships medalists
21st-century Mongolian women